Atheroides is a genus of true bugs belonging to the family Aphididae.

The species of this genus are found in Europe and Northern America.

Species:
 Atheroides brevicornis Laing, 1920 
 Atheroides doncasteri Ossiannilsson, 1955

References

Aphididae